Time Loves a Hero is the sixth studio album by the American rock band Little Feat, released in 1977.

The album's cover art is by Neon Park.

Record World called the title track "a philosophical, mid -tempo funk
tune with some interesting melodic and instrumental hooks."

Track listing

Side One
"Hi Roller" (Paul Barrère) – 3:35 (lead singer: Lowell George)
"Time Loves a Hero" (Barrère, Kenny Gradney, Bill Payne) – 3:47 (lead singers: Bill Payne, Paul Barrère)
"Rocket in My Pocket" (Lowell George) – 3:25 (lead singer: Lowell George)
"Day at the Dog Races" (instrumental) (Barrère, Sam Clayton, Gradney, Richie Hayward, Payne) – 6:27

Side Two
"Old Folks Boogie" (Barrère, Gabriel Barrère) – 3:31 (lead singer: Paul Barrère)
"Red Streamliner" (Payne, Fran Tate) – 4:44 (lead singer: Bill Payne)
"New Delhi Freight Train" (Terry Allen) – 3:42 (lead singer: Lowell George)
"Keepin' Up with the Joneses" (Barrère, George) – 3:51 (lead singer: Paul Barrère)
"Missin' You" (Barrère) – 2:21 (lead singer: Paul Barrère)

Charts

Personnel
Little Feat
Paul Barrère – guitar, vocals
Sam Clayton – congas, percussion, vocals
Lowell George – vocals, guitar
Kenny Gradney – bass
Richie Hayward – drums, percussion, vocals
Bill Payne – keyboards, synthesizer, marimba, vocals

Additional musicians
Greg Adams – trumpet
Jeff "Skunk" Baxter – dobro ("Missin' You")¹
Emilio Castillo – tenor saxophone
Mic Gillette – trombone, trumpet
Stephen "Doc" Kupka – baritone saxophone
Michael McDonald – vocals ("Red Streamliner")
Lenny Pickett – alto saxophone and tenor saxophone
Patrick Simmons – guitar ("New Delhi Freight Train"), vocals ("Red Streamliner")
Fred Tackett – mandocello and guitar ("Time Loves a Hero") (joined band 1988)

Note
¹ Little Feat – Raw Tomatoes Vol.1 (2002) booklet p14: "the skunk was not on that track"

References

1977 albums
Little Feat albums
Albums produced by Ted Templeman
Warner Records albums
Albums with cover art by Neon Park
Albums recorded at Sunset Sound Recorders
Albums recorded at United Western Recorders